Mehrdad Afsari (born 1977) is an Iranian photographer best known for his artistic and unusual landscapes with a conceptual and philosophical approach.

Life and work 
Mehrdad Afsari is an Iranian fine art photographer, documentary film director and video artist. He was born in 1977 in Khoy. He got a B.A. in photography from University of Tehran in 2000 and M.F.A in photography from Tehran University of art in 2006. He has been professor at Tehran University of Art for 14 years. He is an honorary member of Iranian Visual Artists Society.

Since 2001, he has had 16 solo exhibitions in different galleries in Iran and his works have been shown in more than 80 exhibitions around the world such as Iran, China, Germany, US, UAE, Lithuania, Spain, Italy, Slovenia, Turkey, Georgia, France, Canada, Norway, UK such as Photo London 2018, Venice Biennial in Italy, Paris Photo in France, Contemporary Art Istanbul in Turkey, Queens Museum of Art (QMA) in USA, MAO Museum of Architecture and Design in Slovenia, The Reina Sofia Museum in Spain, Georgia Museum of Art, "University of Westminster in London and Tehran museum of contemporary art (TMOCA).

He has also been the Jury member, lecturer and curator of many national and international festivals and exhibitions such as 11th Fajr visual arts Festival at Iranian Academy of the Arts.

Afsari curated the group exhibition Confined Landscape at Mohsen Gallery in Tehran in 2012 and the group exhibition Winter there in 2015. He also curated The Land of Bewilderment memoir exhibition of Mohammad Sayyad's photographs of Iraqi Kurd refugees, exhibited after some thirty years, which are replete with sorrow and bewilderment held in Nabshi Center.

Awards and fellowships 
2005: Third prize, 2nd Iranian Sea Photo Biennial, Iran
2006: First prize, 10th Photography Biennial, Tehran Museum of Contemporary Art, Tehran
2007: Second prize, 4th Iranian Sea Photo Biennial, Iran
2008: "Art Bridge Program", International Arts & Artists, Washington D.C, New York, Charleston, USA
2009: Grant winner at "1 sq. Mile Project", Visiting Arts, London
2016: Selected for "Iran and Norway Artist Exchange Program", Bergen, Norway

Publications

Publications by Afsari
The Gradual Disappearance of Things. Iran: Mohsen gallery, 2014. Edition of 1296 copies.

Publications with contributions by Afsari
Eye 39: Mehrdad Afsari. Iran: Mahriz, 2010. Compiled by Iman Safaei. . Persian and English text. Edition of 1500 copies.
La Photographie Iranienne. Paris: Loco, 2011.
Contemporary Iranian Art: New Perspective. London: Saqi, 2013. By Hamid Keshmirshekan. .

References

External links 
 
 
  23 January 2017

Fine art photographers
University of Tehran alumni
Iranian photographers
Iranian documentary film directors
People from Khoy
1977 births
Living people
Academic staff of Tehran University of Art
Tehran University of Art alumni